David Crosby (1941–2023) was an American musician.

David Crosby may also refer to:

David Douglas Crosby (born 1949), Canadian prelate of the Roman Catholic Church
Dave Crosby, musician in Rheostatics
Dave Crosby, singer, contestant on the US The Voice in 2017

See also
David Crosbie (disambiguation)